"Election Night Special" is a Monty Python sketch parodying the coverage of United Kingdom general elections, specifically the 1970 general election, on the BBC by including hectic (and downright silly) actions by the media and a range of ridiculous candidates.

This sketch was featured in Episode 19 of the Monty Python's Flying Circus TV series, first broadcast on 3 November 1970. A somewhat different version of the sketch (leading into The Lumberjack Song) was also featured on the Monty Python Live at the Theatre Royal Drury Lane album. A longer edit of the Drury Lane version also appeared on the promotional flexidisc Monty Python's Tiny Black Round Thing. The sketch also provides the basis for an item in Monty Python's Big Red Book in the form of a mock pamphlet for the Silly Party, which alongside characters from the original sketch, also names both Paul Fox and Ian MacNaughton as Silly Party candidates.

Throughout the sketch, the linkman (John Cleese) and other commentators appear in a fixed sequence, either giving variations on their original statement or simply repeating it, as results are coming in from various constituencies. The election is mainly contested by two major parties, the Sensible Party and the Silly Party, though third-party candidates (a candidate for the Slightly Silly Party and a Very Silly Independent candidate) make their appearance.

Candidates and their vote totals
The sketch focuses on election results from the following three constituencies:

At the end of the sketch, further results are given in short:
Engelbert Humperdinck gains Barrow in Furness from Ann Haydon-Jones and her husband Pip.
Arthur Negus has held Bristols. "That's not a result, that's a bit of gossip". (Bristols is rhyming slang for 'breasts': Bristol City = titty.)
Mary Whitehouse taking Umbrage (in reaction to the previous "held Bristols").
Wales isn't swinging at all, which is "no surprise"
Monty Python holds the Credits.

The Drury Lane version gives a different set of results:
 A little pink pussycat gains Barrow in Furness, "a gain from the Liberals, there".
 Rastus  Odinga-Odinga has taken Wolverhampton South West; "That's Enoch Powell's old constituency; an important gain for Darkie Power". 
Arthur Negus has held Bristols. "That's not a result, that's a bit of gossip". (see above)
 Sir Alec Douglas-Home has taken Oldham for the Stone-Dead party.
 A small piece of putty about that big, a cheese mechanic from Dunbar and two frogs, one called Kipper and the other one not, have all gone "neep neep neep" in Blackpool Central.

Cultural references

The character Tarquin Fin-tim-lin-bin-whin-bim-lim-bus-stop-F'tang-F'tang-Olé-Biscuitbarrel seemingly made another appearance in the third season, episode twelve, of Monty Python's Flying Circus in the "Spot the Looney" sketch, although was not identified by name.
In the 1981 Crosby by-election, candidate John Desmond Dougrez-Lewis, a 22-year-old student from Hayes in Greater London, changed his name by deed poll to Tarquin Fin-tim-lin-bin-whin-bim-lim-bus-stop-F'tang-F'tang-Olé-Biscuitbarrel. Thus the name was printed on the ballot paper, although the Returning Officer simply referred to him as "Tarquin Biscuitbarrel". He received 223 votes and finished in fifth out of nine candidates. He later participated in the Official Monster Raving Loony Party, which has some conceptual similarities with the Silly Party mentioned in the sketch.
Jeremy Fox stood as a candidate for the Silly Party in Dover in the 1979 British general election, as a protest against the National Front. Fox outpolled the National Front candidate by 642 votes to 378.
The original sketch includes the line, "What do you make of the nylon dog cardigan and plastic mule rest?" These items had been mentioned in The Goon Show episode, "Tales of Old Dartmoor" fourteen years prior.  The linkman later says, "Thank you Spike," apparently in acknowledgement to The Goon Show creator and star Spike Milligan.
In Small Gods by Terry Pratchett, a god called P'tang P'tang, who resembles a giant newt, is worshipped by a small nation of marsh-dwelling nomads totalling fifty-one people. The Great God Om persuades him to help him halt a war.

See also
 List of Monty Python's Flying Circus episodes
 List of recurring Monty Python's Flying Circus characters

References

External links
"Election Night Special" script

Monty Python sketches
1970 British television episodes
Alec Douglas-Home